The Communist Initiative was an orthodox Marxist-Leninist organisation in Austria. It was founded in 2004 as a faction of the Communist Party of Austria (KPÖ). It left the party in 2005. It was a candidate in the parliamentary elections in 2008 as a part of the alliance "The Left". At the elections of the Chamber of Labor in Vienna, it was a candidate in an alliance with the ATIGF (Austrian section of the Communist Party of Turkey/Marxist-Leninist) as "KOMintern" and got 0.7% and one seat. In 2013 the Communist Initiative disbanded and the Party of Labour of Austria was founded.

External links
Official Site
2004 establishments in Austria
2013 disestablishments in Austria
Communist parties in Austria
Defunct communist parties
Defunct political parties in Austria
Political parties disestablished in 2013
Political parties established in 2004